Roshan Mathew (born 22 March 1992) is an Indian actor who works predominantly in Malayalam films and  Hindi, Tamil & Telugu films. He began his career with numerous theatre productions based in Chennai and Mumbai. These include The Glass Menagerie directed by Rajit Kapoor and 07/07/07 directed by Faezeh Jalali.

Roshan had his first major role in the 2016 film Puthiya Niyamam and his career progressed with supporting roles in Aanandam (2016), Koode (2018), and Moothon (2019). For the latter two, he won two SIIMA Awards. He gained wider attention for his leading roles in the dramas Kappela (2020) and C U Soon (2021). Mathew has also appeared in the Hindi films Choked (2020) and Darlings (2022).

Early life
Roshan hails from Changanassery, Kottayam in the Indian state of Kerala. He belongs to A Syro Malabar Catholic family. His father Mathew Joseph is a bank manager in Canara Bank and his mother Regina Augustine is a retired PWD engineer. He studied in Kendriya Vidyalaya, Kottayam. After enrolling in School of Engineering, CUSAT in Kochi he dropped out after one year to study B.Sc Physics in Madras Christian College in Chennai. During his second year in college he developed an interest in acting, and after graduation joined the Drama School Mumbai.

Career

Theatre 
Roshan had been active on stage since school, but his first opportunity to work in professional theatre came when the Chennai-based theatre company Stagefright Productions came to Madras Christian College to audition actors for their production of Dirty Dancing in August 2010. Roshan bagged the role of Neal Kellerman, and the production went on stage at The Museum Theatre, Chennai in February 2011. He almost instantly fell in love with theatre, and went on to work with all the prominent Chennai-based companies in plays such as Kamala, Leap, The Uprising, Tughlaq, and Murder Me Always. He was also part of The Little Theatre’s Christmas Pantomime in 2013. 
In Madras Christian College, Roshan along with his friends started a theatre group called Theatre No. 59 which staged many plays in different colleges in the state. Their production of Alfred Hitchcock/Patrick Hamilton’s Rope was widely appreciated, and their revival of Jean-Paul Sartre’s No Exit won Roshan the award for Best Director at a national level student theatre festival in 2013. 
After moving to Bombay in 2014, Roshan was part of The Drama School Mumbai’s adaptation of Eugene Shwartz's The Dragon in 2016. After school, he went to join Faezeh Jalali's widely acclaimed production 07/07/07. He then appeared in Given directed by Padma Damodaran and written by Shivam Sharma, and Rajit Kapoor's adaptation of The Glass Menagerie. He has also directed an original play in Kochi called A Very Normal Family with a new team of artists based in the city.

Film 
He made his screen acting debut in a web series Tanlines. He made his film debut in 2016 in Puthiya Niyamam directed by A. K. Sajan, followed by a small role in Adi Kapyare Kootamani. It was Ganesh Raj's Aanandam (2016) that put Roshan on the map. The coming-of-age movie opened to packed houses and was one of the biggest successes of the year in Malayalam. In 2018, he essayed a role in Koode directed by Anjali Menon. His other notable performances came in "Thottappan" (2019) alongside Vinayakan, in "Viswasapoorvam Mansoor" (2017), and "Orayiram Kinakkalal" (2018). In 2019, he shot to fame by playing Ameer opposite Nivin Pauly in Geetu Mohandas's film Moothon. His upcoming films are "Varthamanam", directed by Sidhartha Siva along with Parvathy, his debut Tamil film "Cobra" directed by R Ajay Gnanamuthu alongside Vikram (actor). His recently released film is Netflix's Choked directed by Anurag Kashyap alongside Saiyami Kher, Kappela where he played the lead role alongside Anna Ben and  Sreenath Bhasi which gained positive reviews and also C U Soon alongside Fahadh Faasil. His performance in the latest Malayalam movie Kuruthi alongside Prithviraj Sukumaran also garnered much attention.

Filmography

Films
All films are in Malayalam unless otherwise noted.

Television

Awards and nominations

References

External links
 
 
 

|}

Indian male film actors
Male actors in Malayalam cinema
Male actors from Kottayam
Male web series actors
Kendriya Vidyalaya alumni
Madras Christian College alumni
People from Changanassery
Living people
1992 births